Fu Yunlong (Chinese: 符云龙; Pinyin: Fú Yúnlóng;  ; born 18 March 1995) is a Chinese professional football player who currently plays for Chinese Super League club Guangzhou R&F.

Club career
Fu Yunlong was born in Guiyang. He received system football training in Renmin University High School. He joined Chinese Super League side Guangzhou R&F after playing for Beijing Youth in the 2013 National Games of the People's Republic of China. On 6 May 2015, he made his senior debut in the last match of 2015 AFC Champions League group stage against Buriram United in a 5–0 away defeat, coming on as a substitute for Zhang Yuan in the 66th minute. Fu made his Super League debut on 23 April 2016 against Jiangsu Suning, coming on as a substitute for injury Zhang Yaokun in the 86th minute. He conceded a penalty for handball in the injury time which was scored by Jô, as Guangzhou R&F tied with Jiangsu Suning 1–1. On 16 May 2016, he suffered a rupture of cruciate ligament in a reserve league match against Shanghai Shenhua Reserved, which ruling him out of the field for ten months.

Fu was loaned to Hong Kong Premier League side R&F, which was the satellite team of Guangzhou R&F, in March 2017. He made his debut on 19 March 2017 in a 3–1 home defeat against Hong Kong Pegasus. He returned to Guangzhou R&F in June 2017 and made his return debut on 24 June in a 2–1 away win over Tianjin Teda. However, he suffered a recurrence of cruciate ligament rupture on 1 July in a league match against Chongqing Lifan.

In February 2020, Fu was loaned to Hong Kong Premier League side R&F again.

Career statistics 
.

References

External links 

1995 births
Living people
Chinese footballers
Chinese expatriate footballers
People from Guiyang
Footballers from Guizhou
Guangzhou City F.C. players
R&F (Hong Kong) players
Association football defenders
Chinese Super League players
Hong Kong Premier League players
Expatriate footballers in Hong Kong
High School Affiliated to Renmin University of China alumni